The 2014 Asia Cup (also known as Arise Asia Cup) was the twelfth edition of the Asia Cup cricket tournament. The tournament was held in Bangladesh from 25 February to 8 March 2014. Pakistan were the defending champions, having won the previous tournament. The tournament included the four Asian test-playing nations, Bangladesh, India, Pakistan and Sri Lanka; and ICC Asian Associate member Afghanistan. This was the first 50-over tournament in which Afghanistan took part. Ten league matches were played along with the final. The title sponsors of the tournament were Arise India and it was powered by Cycle Agarbathis. Sri Lanka Beat Pakistan in the final to become Asia Cup champions for the fifth time.

Venues

Match officials
There was one umpire from Australia, England, India, New Zealand, Pakistan, South Africa and Sri Lanka each. There were three umpires from Bangladesh.
The two ICC Match Referees were from England and New Zealand.

Umpires from neutral countries
  Nigel Llong
  Bruce Oxenford
  Billy Bowden
  Johan Cloete

Umpires from participating countries 
  Anisur Rahman
  Masudur Rahman
 Tanvir Ahmed
  Raveendra Wimalasiri.
  Nandan
  Ahsan Raza

Match Referees
  Jeff Crowe
  Chris Broad

Squads

Notes

 The squad for India had MS Dhoni as captain but he was ruled out due to injury and was replaced with Virat Kohli as captain and Dinesh Karthik as wicket-keeper.
 Shakib Al Hasan suffered a match ban, hence he stayed out of the first two matches against India and Afghanistan.
 Tamim Iqbal was ruled out due to injury from the Bangladesh squad.
 Mashrafe Mortaza was ruled out of the Bangladesh squad due to injury after the first match against India.
 Sohag Gazi was ruled out of the Bangladesh squad due to injury after the second match against Afghanistan.

Schedule

Points table

 Qualified for final

Fixtures and results

Final

Records and statistics

Batting 
Source: Cricinfo

Bowling
Source: Cricinfo

Achievements
Match 1
 Lasith Malinga took his 6th five wicket haul in ODIs. It was his first five wicket haul in ODIs since January 2012.
 Lahiru Thirimanne made his 2nd ODI ton.

Match 2
 Mohammed Shami took his career best figures of 10–1–50–4.
 Mushfiqur Rahim made his career best score of 117.
 Only the second time that both captains (Virat Kohli and Mushfiqur Rahim) scored 100 runs.

Match 3
 First ever match between Afghanistan and Pakistan.
 Umar Akmal made his 2nd ODI ton.
 Afghanistan became the  seventh team  to play a match in the Asia Cup.

Match 4
 Ravichandran Ashwin reached 100 ODI wickets for India.
 Kumar Sangakkara became the third batsman to score 4000+ runs against India.
 Kumar Sangakkara made his 18th ODI ton.
 Bhuvneshwar Kumar became the second player to be stumped on a wide, without facing a single legal ball (Diamond duck) in cricket history.

Match 5
 First ever match between Afghanistan and Bangladesh.
 Afghanistan registered their first win against a test playing nation.
 Asghar Stanikzai made his career best score of 90 not out.

Match 6
 This match was Ravindra Jadeja's 100th ODI.
 This match was Mohammad Talha's debut ODI.
 Mohammad Hafeez made his 19th ODI fifty.

Match 7
 First ever match between Afghanistan and Sri Lanka.
 Kumar Sangakkara became the second player to score 1000+ runs in Asia Cup history after Sanath Jayasuriya.
 Kumar Sangakkara made his 85th ODI fifty. It was his 12th 50+ score in Asia Cup tournaments.

Match 8
 Imrul Kayes and Anamul Haque added 150 for the first wicket which became Bangladesh's second best opening stand in ODIs.
 Ahmed Shehzad made his 5th ODI ton.
 Shahid Afridi's fifty off 18 balls became the fastest fifty in a chase and the second fastest in ODIs.
 327 became Pakistan's highest successful run chase in ODIs, beating their previous highest chase of 322 runs against India in Mohali in 2007.

Match 9
 First ever match between Afghanistan and India.
Mohammed Shami became the second fastest Indian bowler to take 50 ODI wickets.

Match 10
 As a result of this match, Sri Lanka won 4 out of 4 league matches and Bangladesh lost 4 out 4 league matches.

Final
 Fawad Alam made his maiden ODI ton.
 Lasith Malinga took his 2nd five wicket haul  of the tournament, becoming the first bowler to take 3 five wicket hauls in Asia Cup history. It was his 7th five wicket haul in ODIs.
 Lahiru Thirimanne made his 3rd ODI ton and became the top scorer of the tournament with 279 runs in 5 matches. He was thus awarded Man of the Series.
 Mahela Jayawardene made his 71st ODI fifty.
 Sri Lanka won the tournament undefeated after losing all their matches in the previous tournament.
 Sri Lanka tied with India for the record of most Asia Cup titles (5).

References

External links
 Arise Asia Cup 2014 

Asia Cup
Asia Cup
International cricket competitions in 2014
International cricket competitions in Bangladesh
Cricket in Dhaka
Cricket in Sher-e-Bangla National Cricket Stadium
Asia Cup
Asia Cup